Sofiane Ben Braham (born 1 February 1990) is a French professional footballer of Algerian descent who plays as a defender for ASM Oran. Prior to moving to Algeria in 2014, Ben Braham had spent his playing career in the French lower leagues with AC Amiens and Red Star Saint-Ouen.

Honours
AC Amiens
 CFA2 Group A winners: 2010–11

MC Alger
 Algerian Super Cup winners: 2014

References

External links
 
 

1990 births
Living people
People from Montfermeil
Footballers from Seine-Saint-Denis
French footballers
Association football defenders
AC Amiens players
Red Star F.C. players
MC Alger players
Championnat National players
Algerian Ligue Professionnelle 1 players